USS Boxer may refer to: 

, was a 14-gun brig constructed by C. and D. Churchill of Middletown, Connecticut, and commissioned in 1815 under Lt. John Porter.
, was a 10-gun schooner commissioned in 1832.
, was originally the blockade runner Tristram Shandy, captured during the Civil War on 15 May 1864.
, was a training brigantine commissioned on 11 May 1905.
, was an aircraft carrier launched on 14 December 1944 and commissioned on 16 April 1945.
, is an amphibious assault ship commissioned on 11 February 1995 and currently on active duty.

United States Navy ship names